Tylopilus suavissimus is a bolete fungus in the family Boletaceae. Found in the Belgian Congo, it was described as new to science in 1951 by Paul Heinemann and M. Goossens-Fontana.

References

External links

suavissimus
Fungi described in 1951
Fungi of Africa